Midway Stock Farm Barn was a historic building located north of Keosauqua, Iowa, United States. The barn was built by William A. Barker around 1880. It gained historical significance when his son Webb installed equipment made by the Louden Machinery Company of Fairfield, Iowa. By doing so he converted the facility from one that raised livestock to a dairy operation. Around 1918 Barker built an addition onto the south side of the barn and installed a litter carrier with tracks and switches on the ground floor, a hay carrier with a steel track and grapple hook hay fork also on the main floor, and a metal aerator on the roof. It was one of a few local operations that still had the Louden equipment in place.

The barn was listed on the National Register of Historic Places in 1999. On July 19, 2018, it was destroyed by a tornado, and the following year it was removed from the National Register.

References

Buildings and structures in Van Buren County, Iowa
National Register of Historic Places in Van Buren County, Iowa
Barns on the National Register of Historic Places in Iowa
Former National Register of Historic Places in Iowa
Buildings and structures destroyed by tornado